Columbia County is a county located in the U.S. state of Arkansas. As of the 2020 census, the population was 22,801. The county seat is Magnolia. The county was formed on December 17, 1852, and was named for Christopher Columbus. The Magnolia, AR Micropolitan Statistical Area includes all of Columbia County.

Geography

Columbia County is in South Arkansas. Columbia County, along with Union County, is home to the largest Bromine reserve in the United States.

Dorcheat Bayou flows through Columbia County from its origin in Nevada County southward into Webster Parish, Louisiana, before emptying into Lake Bistineau.

Adjacent counties
 Nevada County (north)
 Ouachita County (northeast)
 Union County (east)
 Claiborne Parish, Louisiana (southeast)
 Webster Parish, Louisiana (south)
 Lafayette County (west)

Demographics

2020 census

As of the 2020 United States census, there were 22,801 people, 8,562 households, and 5,559 families residing in the county.

2000 census
As of the 2000 census, there were 25,603 people, 9,981 households, and 6,747 families residing in the county.  The population density was 33 people per square mile (13/km2).  There were 11,566 housing units at an average density of 15 per square mile (6/km2).  The racial makeup of the county was 62.08% White, 36.06% Black or African American, 0.26% Native American, 0.34% Asian, 0.03% Pacific Islander, 0.46% from other races, and 0.77% from two or more races.  1.05% of the population were Hispanic or Latino of any race.

There were 9,981 households, out of which 30.10% had children under the age of 18 living with them, 48.90% were married couples living together, 15.10% had a female householder with no husband present, and 32.40% were non-families. 29.20% of all households were made up of individuals, and 13.80% had someone living alone who was 65 years of age or older.  The average household size was 2.45 and the average family size was 3.03.

In the county, the population was spread out, with 25.10% under the age of 18, 12.30% from 18 to 24, 25.30% from 25 to 44, 21.40% from 45 to 64, and 15.90% who were 65 years of age or older.  The median age was 36 years. For every 100 females there were 90.90 males.  For every 100 females age 18 and over, there were 86.70 males.

The median income for a household in the county was $27,640, and the median income for a family was $36,271. Males had a median income of $31,313 versus $20,099 for females. The per capita income for the county was $15,322.  About 15.80% of families and 21.10% of the population were below the poverty line, including 28.70% of those under age 18 and 20.00% of those age 65 or over.

Transportation

Major highways
  U.S. Highway 79
  U.S. Highway 82
  U.S. Highway 371
  Highway 19
  Highway 98
  Highway 160
  Future Interstate 69

Airports
Magnolia Municipal Airport is a public-use airport in Columbia County. It is owned by the city of Magnolia and located three nautical miles (6 km) southeast of its central business district.

Government
Over the past few election cycles Columbia County has trended heavily towards the GOP. The last Democrat (as of 2020) to carry this county was Bill Clinton in 1996.

Communities

Cities
 Magnolia (county seat)

Towns
 Emerson
 McNeil
 Taylor
 Waldo

Unincorporated community

 Atlanta
 Big Creek
 Brister
 Bussey
 Calhoun
 Jefferson
 Lamartine
 Plainfield
 Village
 Walkerville
 Welcome

Townships

 Emerson (Emerson)
 McNeil (McNeil)
 Magnolia (Magnolia)
 Taylor (Taylor)
 Village
 Waldo (Waldo)

Education
School districts include:
 Emerson-Taylor-Bradley School District
 Lafayette County School District - Formed in 2003 when the Lewisville School District and the Stamps School District merged.
 Magnolia School District
 Smackover-Norphlet School District - Formerly Smackover School District until the Norphlet School District merged into it in 2014

Former school districts:
 The Emerson-Taylor School District formed in 2004 when the Emerson School District and the Taylor School District merged. It became the Emerson-Taylor-Bradley in 2013 after the Bradley School District merged into it.
 Stephens School District - Dissolved in 2014, with the Magnolia district taking the portion in Columbia County.
 Waldo School District - Merged into the Magnolia district in 2006.

See also
 List of lakes in Columbia County, Arkansas
 National Register of Historic Places listings in Columbia County, Arkansas

References

External links
Columbia County Sheriff's Office

 
1852 establishments in Arkansas
Populated places established in 1852